Andrew Fairlie is a Scottish actor who is most famous for playing the role of Gash Nesbitt in the BBC sitcom Rab C. Nesbitt. He also starred as Sunny Jim in the 1994 BBC Scotland series The Tales of Para Handy.

Between the end of the regular series of Rab C. Nesbitt in 1999 and 2008, Fairlie did no acting, until reprising the role of Gash in the 2008 Christmas special. He did not return for the new series of Rab C Nesbitt and was replaced by Iain Robertson.

Appearances 
Rab C. Nesbitt (1988-2008)...as Gash Nesbitt
Taggart (1989–90)...as Barman
The Tales of Para Handy (1994–95)...as Sunny Jim
Pulp Video (1995)...as Various Characters
Atletico Partick (1996)...Dezzy

External links
 

1963 births
Living people
Scottish male television actors
People from Broxburn, West Lothian